Clément Soubeyras is a French rugby league footballer who plays for AS Carcassonne in the Elite One Championship.

Playing career
Soubeyras made his senior debut for Carpentras XIII in 2008. He left the club in 2011 and moved to Pia Donkeys, before joining AS Carcassonne in 2013.

International career
Soubeyras represented France at junior level. He was called into the senior squad and made his debut against Wales in 2012.

He was named in the France squad for the 2013 Rugby League World Cup, however he was forced to pull out due to injury prior to the tournament and was replaced by Benjamin Garcia.

Soubeyras played in the 2014 European Cup.

References

Living people
AS Carcassonne players
Baroudeurs de Pia XIII players
France national rugby league team players
French rugby league players
RC Carpentras XIII players
Rugby league fullbacks
Rugby league wingers
Sportspeople from Marseille
Year of birth missing (living people)